Tim Wright (born 18 February 1973) is an Australian former world champion lightweight rower. He won a gold medal at the 1997 World Rowing Championships in Aiguebelette with the lightweight men's eight.

Club and state rowing
Wright took up rowing at Ballarat High School as a coxswain. His senior rowing was from the Wendouree-Ballarat Rowing Club.

Richards rowed in Victorian representative men's lightweight fours contesting the Penrith Cup at the Interstate Regatta within the Australian Rowing Championships in 1997 and 1999.

International representative rowing
Wright first represented Australia in the lightweight coxless at the 1994  World Rowing U23 Championships in Paris where the Australians finished fourth. The following year at Groningen in The Netherlands he again raced at the U23 World Championships in the lightweight coxless four and they won the silver medal.

In 1997 he made his debut in an Australian senior crew seated in the bow of the men's lightweight eight. At the 1997 World Rowing Championships in Aiguebelette, the Australians won a thrilling final by 0.03 seconds with only 1.5 lengths separating the field. Wright won his first and only World Championship title in his only senior World Championship appearance.

References

 

1973 births
Living people
Australian male rowers
World Rowing Championships medalists for Australia